The Prix Juteau-Duvigneaux of the foundation of the same name, was an annual prize in philosophy awarded by the Académie française. Starting in 1896, it was awarded to the author or authors of works in Ethics, especially from the Catholic point of view.

Laureates

From 1898 to 1919
 1898 : 
 Louis Énault for Le rachat d’une âme
 Jacques de La Faye (1855?-1940?) for L’Irlande au XIXe siècle : O’Connell
 Maurice Landrieux for Aux pays du Christ
 Marie O'Kennedy for Inventaire de ma chambre
 1899 : 
 Abbé Henri Boissonnot (1856-19..) for Le cardinal Meignan
 Comtesse Roger de Courson (1849-1931) for Quatre portraits de femmes and La persécution des catholiques en Angleterre
 Jean Guiraud for Saint-Dominique
 Henri Joly for Psychologie des Saints
 Joseph Lavergne (1859-1946) for Madame Julie Lavergne, sa vie et son œuvre
 1900 : 
 Félix Klein for L’évêque de Metz. Vie de Mgr Dupont des Loges (1804-1886)
 Abbé Ernest Ricard (1852-1944) for Joseph-Auguste Séguret, le jeune martyr du Laos
 1901 : 
 Marie-Blanche-Angeline d'Adhémar (1849-1935) for La femme catholique et la démocratie française
 Henri Bremond for L’inquiétude religieuse
 Jean Guibert (1857-1914) for Histoire de Saint Jean-Baptiste de la Salle
 Max Turmann (1866-1943) for L’Éducation populaire and Au sortir de l’école. Les Patronages
 1902 : 
 Antoine Bernard for Le sermon au XVIIIe siècle
 Abbé Eugène Griselle (1861-1923) for Bourdaloue
 Émile Horn (1858-1937) for Sainte Élisabeth de Hongrie
 Fernand Nicolaÿ for Histoire des croyances
 1903 : 
 Abbé Édouard Lecanuet (1853-1916) for Montalembert
 1904 : 
 Charles Baille (1832-1919) for Le cardinal de Rohan-Chabot (1788-1833)
 Dom Antoine du Bourg (1838-1918) for Le frère Gabriel (1835-1897)
 Abbé Auguste-Pierre Laveille (1856-1928) for Jean-Marie de Lamennais (1780-1860)
 Jean Lionnet for Un évêque social : Ketteler
 1905 : 
 Joseph-Émile Fidao-Justiniani (1875-1950) for Le droit des humbles
 George Fonsegrive for Mariage et union libre
 Alphonse Kannengieser for Catholiques allemands
 Georges Renouard (1845-19..) for L’ouest africain et les missions catholiques (Congo et Oubanghi)
 1906 : 
 Vicomte de Bourbon-Busset for La science considérée comme force morale
 Henri Bremond for Newman
 G. de Montgesty for Jean-Gabriel Perboyre
 1907 : 
 Joseph Aulagne for La réforme catholique du XVIIème siècle dans le diocèse de Limoges
 Madeleine Combes de Patris for Henriette de Séguret
 Charles-Alexandre Geoffroy de Grandmaison for Madame Louise de France (1737-1787)
 M. de Moussac for Monseigneur de Ségur
 1908 : 
 Joseph Buche (1861-1942) for L’abbé Camille Rambaud de Lyon
 Chanoine Léon-Adolphe Lenfant for Le cœur et ses richesses
 Adolphe Regnier (1858-1917) for Saint Martin (316-397)
 1909 : 
 Henriette Dacier for Saint Jean Chrysostome et la femme chrétienne au IVème siècle de l’Église grecque
 R.P. Daniel-Antonin Mortier (1858-1942) for Histoire des maîtres généraux de l’ordre des Frères prêcheurs
 Abbé Jules Paquier (1864-1932) for Le Jansénisme
 1910 : 
 Pierre Batiffol for L’Enseignement de Jésus
 R.P. Amédée Chauvin (1852-1923) for De la préparation de la jeunesse à la liberté
 Ernest Dimnet for Figures de moines
 Isabelle Kaiser for Marcienne de Flüe. Journal d'une femme
 Maurice Landrieux for Une petite sœur
 Alexandre Le Roy for La religion des primitifs
 1911 : 
 François Bournand for Pages de la Charité
 Henri Bremond for L’inquiétude religieuse
 Abbé J.-B. Chaillet for L’abbé Béraud
 Abbé Léon Jaud (1856-1934) for Saint Filibert
 Jules Lebreton for Les origines du dogme de la Trinité
 Abbé Pierre Schoenher for Histoire du séminaire de Saint-Nicolas du Chardonnet
 Jacques Zeiller for L’idée de l’État dans Saint-Thomas d’Aquin
 1912 : 
 Abbé Antoine Degert (1859-1931) for Histoire des séminaires français jusqu’à la Révolution
 Henri-Marie Delsart for Sainte Fare, sa vie et son culte
 Abbé Léon Désers (1851-1929) for L’Éducation morale et ses conditions
 Paul Dudon (1859-1941) for Lamennais et le Saint-Siège (1820-1834)
 Abbé Léon Labauche (1871-1955) for Leçons de théologie dogmatique
 Abbé Georges Michelet for Dieu et l’agnosticisme contemporain
 M. de Moussac (1847-1916) for Un prêtre d’autrefois, l’abbé de Moussac vicaire général de Poitiers (1753-1827)
 1913 : 
 Louis Garriguet (1859-1927) for La valeur sociale de l’Évangile
 Alphonse Kannengieser for Un Alsacien : Léon Lefébvre
 Joseph Tixeront for Histoire des dogmes
 1914 : 
 Abbé Marius Chaillan (1858-1937) for Saint Césaire (470-543)
 Marianne-Constance de Ganay for Les bienheureuses dominicaines (1190-1577)
 Chanoine Paul Fiel (1879-1939) for Gustave III et la rentrée du catholicisme en Suède
 Abbé François Guéret (1863-1936) for Ite ad oves
 Abbé Auguste-Pierre Laveille (1856-1928) for Chesnelong, sa vie, son action catholique et parlementaire
 Henri Le Floch for Claude-François Poullard des Places (1679-1709)
 Abbé Jules Paquier (1864-1932) for Luther et le luthéranisme
 Maurice Souriau (1856-195.?) for Deux mystiques normands au XVIIème siècle
 1916 : 
 Abbé Pierre Lelièvre for Leur âme est immortelle
 Ambroise de Poulpiquet for Le Dogme, source d’unité et de sainteté dans l'Église
 Abbé Rivet for Institutions du droit ecclésiastique
 Pierre Rousselot for L’intellectualisme de Saint-Thomas
 1917 : 
 Louis Arnould for La Providence et le Bonheur
 Émile Chénon for L’Église et la Guerre
 Abbé Pierre Jardet for La Femme catholique, son apostolat, son action religieuse et sociale
 R.P. Jean-Marie Lambert (1857-1935) for Une âme vaillante et rayonnante (Léon Asson)
 Abbé Charles Sauvé (1848-1925) for Le prêtre intime, élévations
 1918 : 
 Albert Autin (1883-1963) for L’échec de la réforme en France au XVIème siècle
 Abbé Charles Guillemant (1865-1931) for Pierre-Louis Parisis
 Pierre Harispe for Les étapes de Dieu vers nous
 Félix Klein for Dieu nous aime
 Robert Vallery-Radot for Le réveil de l’esprit
 1919 : 
 Pierre Batiffol for Leçons sur la messe
 Alphonse Kannengieser for En Alsace après l’annexion. M. l’abbé J.-I. Simonis
 Abbé Pierre Pourrat (1871-1957) for La spiritualité chrétienne des origines de l’Église au moyen âge

From 1920 to 1939
 1920 : 
 R.P. Frédégand d'Anvers (1885-1967) for Étude sur le P. Charles d’Arenberg
 Abbé Joseph Castillon for Nos douleurs fécondes
 Abbé Jean-Amable de La Vallette-Monbrun (1872-1930) for Maine de Biran
 Abbé Louis Prunel (1874-1932) for Cours supérieur de religion
 1921 : 
 P. Albert Bessières (1877-1953) for Âmes nouvelles
 P. Joseph Bricout (1867-1930) for Monseigneur d’Hulst, apologiste
 Augustin Fliche for Saint Grégoire VII
 Noël Hallé for La guerre française et chrétienne
 Joseph  Martin and Edmée Vesco de Kereven (1871-1945) for La famille Aubert
 1922 : 
 Gustave Bardy for En lisant les Pères
 Bernard du Boisrouvray for Monseigneur Gay, évêque d'Anthédon (1815-1892)
 G. Du Bourg for Sous l’uniforme et sous le froc. Dom Antoine du Bourg (1838-1918)
 R.P. Georges Guitton (1877-1962) for Louis Lenoir, aumônier des Marsouins (1914-1917)
 Dom Auguste-Marie-Pierre Ingold (1852-1923) for Général et trappiste. Le Père Marie-Joseph, baron de Céramb (1772-1848)
 Abbé Pierre Lelièvre for Histoire catholique de la France
 Albert Lopez for La lumière d’Israël
 Jeanne Taillandier for Sœur Marie Saint-Anselme
 1923 : 
 Abbé Paul Buysse for Vers la croyance
 Louis-Claude Fillion for Vie de Notre Seigneur Jésus-Christ
 Mme Ad. Goutay for Les voix de la piété française
 Gaston Sortais (1852-1926) for La philosophie moderne depuis Bacon jusqu’à Leibnitz
 Abbé Charles Thellier de Poncheville for La vie divinisée
 1924 : 
 Paul Cheneau (18..-1926) for Les saints d’Égypte
 R.P. Victor Hostachy (1885-1967) for Joie et Sainteté
 Alphonse Kannengieser for Un sociologue alsacien, l’abbé Henri Cetty, curé de Mulhouse
 Félix Klein for Madeleine Sémer, convertie et mystique (1874-1921)
 Gabriel Ledos (1864-1939) for Saint Pierre Claver (1585-1654)

References

Académie Française awards
Philosophy awards
Awards established in 1896